Mahe Lighthouse is a lighthouse situated on the south side of the entrance of Mayyazhi river in Mahe, Puducherry. It was established in the year 1893. There is a project by the Directorate General of Lighthouses and Lightships to upgrade the lighthouse.

Details 
The focal plane of the beam is 30 m (98 ft). It emits two white flashes every 10 seconds. The structure is a 13-metre (43 feet) tall round cylindrical tower.

See also 

 List of lighthouses in India
 Pondicherry Lighthouse

References

External links 
 Directorate General of Lighthouses and Lightships

Lighthouses in Kerala
Buildings and structures in Puducherry
Lighthouses completed in 1893
1893 establishments in India